Leucanopsis rufoochracea is a moth in the family Erebidae. It was described by Walter Rothschild in 1922. It is found in Brazil.

References

rufoochracea
Moths described in 1922